Girl (Devojka) is a 1965 Yugoslav film directed by Puriša Đorđević.

References

1965 films
Yugoslav war drama films